Victor-Félix Bernadou (25 June 1816 – 15 November 1891) was a French cardinal, since 1867 Archbishop of Sens.

Biography
Born in Castres, he was ordained to the priesthood on 19 December 1840. By 7 April 1862 he was appointed bishop of Gap, received his episcopal consecration on 29 June 1862 from Archbishop Jean-Joseph-Marie-Eugène de Jerphanion, with bishops Louis-Antoine Pavy and Jean-Jacques Bardou serving as co-consecrators. He was promoted to metropolitan see of Sens on 12 July 1867, which he remained until death. He took part in First Vatican Council. On 7 July 1886 Pope Leo XIII created him Cardinal Priest.

He died in Sens, and was buried in Cathédrale Saint-Étienne de Sens

References

1816 births
1891 deaths
People from Castres
19th-century French cardinals
Archbishops of Sens
Bishops of Gap
Cardinals created by Pope Leo XIII
Participants in the First Vatican Council